Atanas Petrov Iliev (born 9 October 1994) is a Bulgarian footballer who plays as a striker for Cherno More Varna.

Career
Born in Dobrich, Iliev began his career with the local club, Dobrudzha Dobrich, before he joined the Cherno More Academy in 2009. He made his first team début in a 0-2 A PFG defeat at Beroe on 5 May 2012, coming on as a substitute for Ilian Kapitanov.

On 27 January 2023, Iliev's contract with Ascoli was terminated by mutual consent.

On 31 January 2023, Iliev returned to Cherno More.

International career
Iliev was called up to the senior Bulgaria squad for the first time in March 2021 for the 2022 FIFA World Cup qualification matches against Switzerland on 25 March 2021, Italy on 28 March 2021 and Northern Ireland on 31 March 2021. He made his debut on 25 March 2021 against Switzerland.

International goals
Scores and results list Bulgaria's goal tally first.

Career statistics

References

External links

1994 births
People from Dobrich
Living people
Bulgarian footballers
Association football forwards
Bulgaria youth international footballers
Bulgaria international footballers
PFC Cherno More Varna players
PFC Dobrudzha Dobrich players
FC Montana players
Botev Plovdiv players
Ascoli Calcio 1898 F.C. players
First Professional Football League (Bulgaria) players
Serie B players
Bulgarian expatriate footballers
Expatriate footballers in Italy
Bulgarian expatriate sportspeople in Italy